Ngao is a village and tambon (subdistrict) of Thoeng District, in Chiang Rai Province, Thailand. In 2005 it had a population of 9943 people. The tambon contains 20 villages.

The conspicuous Doi Ian mountain is in Ngao Subdistrict.

References

Tambon of Chiang Rai province
Populated places in Chiang Rai province